Gwyneth (sometimes Gweneth) is a Welsh feminine given name which derives from the kingdom of Gwynedd.  Notable people:
Gwyneth Boodoo, an American psychologist and expert on educational measurement
Gwyneth Cravens, an American novelist and journalist
Gwyneth Dunwoody (1930–2008), a Member of Parliament in the United Kingdom
Gwyneth Glyn (born 1979), a Welsh language poet and musician
Gwyneth Herbert (born 1981), a British singer-songwriter and composer
Gwyneth Ho (born 1990), a Hong Kong social activist and former journalist
Gwyneth Hughes, British screenwriter and documentary director
Mabel Gweneth Humphreys, mathematician
Gwyneth Johnstone (1915–2010), English landscape painter
Gwyneth Jones (novelist) (born 1952), a British science fiction and fantasy writer and critic
Dame Gwyneth Jones (soprano) DBE (born 1936), a Welsh soprano
Gwyneth Lewis (born 1959), a Welsh poet, and the first National Poet for Wales
Gweneth Lilly (1920–2004), Welsh writer and teacher
Gweneth Molony (born 1932), Australian figure skater
Gwyneth Paltrow (born 1972), an American actress and businesswoman.
Gwyneth Powell (1946-2022), an English actress
Gwyneth Rees (born 1968), a British author of children's books
Gwyneth Scally, a visual contemporary artist from Tucson, Arizona, United States
Gwyneth Stallard, British mathematician
Gwyneth Strong (born 1959), an English actress
Gwyneth Walker (born 1947), an American composer
Gwenethe Walshe (1908–2006), British dancer 
Gweneth Whitteridge, medical historian

Gwyneth is also the name of the following fictional characters:
a character in the Fur Fighters video game
the title character of Gwyneth and the Thief, a young adult historical romance novel written by Margaret Moore
Gwyneth, a character in the Dragonlance novel The Legend of Huma
Gwynneth, an Australian Masked Owl from the Wolves of the Beyond fantasy novel series by Kathryn Lasky

See also
 Gwynedd (disambiguation)

References

English feminine given names
Scottish feminine given names
Welsh feminine given names